Couteau may refer to:

 4909 Couteau, the asteroid Couteau, 4909th asteroid registered
 Robert Couteau (born 1956), U.S. astrologer
 Rural Municipality of Coteau No. 255, Saskatchewan, Canada

See also

 Coteau (disambiguation)